Morrisburg Airport  is an airport  east-northeast of Morrisburg, Ontario, Canada, adjacent to the tourist site Upper Canada Village. It has a single,  paved runway oriented northeast–southwest. The airport is unattended and has no facilities or resident aircraft; it is closed during the winter months.

References

Registered aerodromes in Ontario
St. Lawrence Parks Commission